Belchior (born Antônio Carlos Belchior, October 26, 1946 – April 30, 2017) was a Brazilian singer and composer. He was one of the first MPB singers from the Brazilian northeast to reach mainstream success, in the early 1970s.

His 1976 album Alucinação [] is considered by many critics to be the single most influential album in the history of MPB, and one of the most important music albums ever published in Brazil. In 2008, Rolling Stone Brasil named Belchior as the 100th greatest artist in Brazilian music history, and subsequently as the 58th biggest voice in Brazilian music history.

Biography

Antônio Carlos Belchior was born in Sobral, Ceará, Brazil on October 26, 1946.

In 1972 Elis Regina recorded his composition Mucuripe (with Fagner), which was later recorded by Roberto Carlos.

In August 2009, the Fantástico TV show reported that Belchior had not been seen since 2007, after leaving his car parked at the Congonhas Airport, in São Paulo. There were rumors that he had gone into hiding, engaged on the translation of Dante's Divine Comedy into Portuguese, a project on which he had been working for some time. According to the TV news, not even his family had heard from the singer or knew his whereabouts. On August 30, 2009, the same TV show discovered Belchior living with his second wife Edna in a small village in San Gregorio de Polanco, Uruguay. In this interview, he denied having disappeared, declaring he was "resting, composing and thinking about life". In 2012, he disappeared again, alongside his wife, from a 4-star hotel in Artigas, Uruguay, leaving unpaid bills and personal objects behind. For years, not even his family was aware of his whereabouts.

He died of a heart attack on April 30, 2017, at the age of 70. Then-governor of Ceará, Camilo Santana, declared three days of official mourning.

Discography

 1971 – Na Hora do Almoço (Copacabana – Compacto)
 1973 – Sorry, Baby (Copacabana – Compacto)
 1974 – Mote e Glosa (Continental – LP)
 1976 – Alucinação (Polygram – LP/CD/K7)
 1977 – Coração Selvagem (Warner – LP/CD/K7)
 1978 – Todos os Sentidos (Warner – LP/CD/K7)
 1979 – Era uma Vez um Homem e Seu Tempo (Warner – LP/CD/K7)
 1980 – Objeto Direto (Warner – LP)
 1982 – Paraíso (Warner – LP)
 1984 – Cenas do Próximo Capítulo (Paraíso/Odeon – LP)
 1986 – Um Show: 10 Anos de Sucesso (Continental – LP)
 1987 – Melodrama (Polygram – LP/K7)
 1988 – Elogio da Loucura (Polygram – LP/K7)
 1990 – Projeto Fanzine (Polygram – LP/K7)
 1991 – Divina Comédia Humana (MoviePlay – CD)
 1991 – Acústico (Arlequim Discos – CD)
 1993 – Baihuno (MoviePlay – CD)
 1995 – Um Concerto Bárbaro – Acústico Ao vivo (Universal Music – CD)
 1996 – Vício Elegante (Paraíso/GPA/Velas – CD)
 1999 – Autorretrato (BMG – CD)
 1999 – Alucinação
 2002 – Pessoal do Ceará (Continental / Warner – CD)
 2008 – Sempre (Som Livre – CD)

References

External links
Official website

People from Sobral, Ceará
1946 births
2017 deaths
20th-century Brazilian male singers
20th-century Brazilian singers
Brazilian composers
Música Popular Brasileira singers
Música Popular Brasileira guitarists